William Grinsell Nicholl  (London 1796–1871) was a British 19th-century architectural and monumental sculptor.

Life
He was born in Marylebone, London in 1796. In 1822 he attended the Royal Academy Schools.

He exhibited in the Royal Academy from 1822 to 1861 and was highly respected. His studio was on Grafton Street East - off Tottenham Court Road, London

He died in Acton in west London on 8 December 1871.

Architectural Works
London Customs House (1827) - entablature as part of rebuilding after partial collapse.
Portico and columns of the Fitzwilliam Museum, Cambridge (1830-1837) - under George Basevi and designed by Charles Lock Eastlake.
Bas-reliefs over windows at the Oxford and Cambridge Club in London (1838) - under Sir Robert Smirke.
Four lions at foot of stairs, Fitzwilliam Museum (1839).
Pediment of the Taylor Institute in Oxford (1846)- under George Basevi and later Charles Robert Cockerell
Pediment and columns of St George's Hall, Liverpool (1850) - under Charles Robert Cockerell.
Four lions at St George's Hall, Liverpool (1855)
Reredos at Waltham Abbey Church (1862) under William Burges.
Lectern, two large candlesticks and two statues in Worcester College Chapel, Oxford University (1866) under William Burges.

Other Works
Bust of Henry Sass (1820) -possibly as Nicholl's tutor
Bust of George III (c.1822) copy of Jubilee Bust by Peter Turnerelli
Bust of John Law, Archdeacon of Rochester (1827), Chatham Parish Church
Bust of Philip Rundell (1827) now in Victoria and Albert Museum
Statue of Captain Cook (1844) Royal Academy
Monument to Sir John Hippisley (1825) Temple Church, Inner Temple, London. Destroyed in the Blitz.
Monument to John Frewen-Turner (1829) Cold Overton, Leicestershire
Monument to Henry Wootton (1830) at Minster, Kent
Monument to Sir George Don (1832) in Garrison Church, Gibraltar (now the Anglican Cathedral). Designed by George Basevi.
Monument to Joseph Bonsor(1835) Great Bookham parish church, Surrey
Monument to Elizabeth Morley (1837) Walthamstow Parish Church
Monument to Richard Stevenson (1837) Trinity College Chapel, Cambridge
Monument to Rev J. Murray (1862) St Andrews Church, Wells Street, London. The church was demolished and rebuilt in 1933–4 as St Andrew’s, Kingsbury.
Medallions, bas relief carvings and architectural details in the Octagon room of the Garden Pavilion in the Grounds of Buckingham Palace (1846). Pavillion removed (1928)
Statues of Lord Cornwallis and Lord Clive at the India Office,London. (1867)

Family
He married Emma Elizabeth Nicholson in Paddington, London, on 17 April 1821. Between 1851 and 1854 they lived with most of their children in Sydney, Australia. Nicholl's second daughter, Charlotte Anne (1824-1905), married John Russell an iron founder, 17 February 1855 in St James Church, Sydney and their son John Peter Russell, the Australian impressionist painter, was born in 1858.

References

1796 births
1871 deaths
People from Marylebone
British sculptors